Tieling railway station is a railway station located in Yinzhou District, Tieling, Liaoning, China. It was built in 1901.

References

See also 
 Tieling West railway station

Stations on the Beijing–Harbin Railway
Railway stations in Tieling
Railway stations in Liaoning
Railway stations in China opened in 1901